The Hampden–Sydney Tigers college football team compete in the National Collegiate Athletic Association's (NCAA) Division III, representing Hampden–Sydney College in the Old Dominion Athletic Conference.  Hampden–Sydney has played their home games at Everett Stadium in Hampden–Sydney, Virginia since 2007, replacing the 40-year-old Hundley Stadium. Hampden–Sydney's playing surface, originally named Venable Field, was built on a former frog pond dredged by students in 1896. In 1915, according to tradition, the field was nicknamed "Death Valley" by a defeated Richmond College player because Hampden–Sydney so frequently trounced opposing teams at home.

The Tigers have had seven undefeated regular seasons, is tied with Randolph–Macon for second in the ODAC with 9 total conference championships behind only Emory & Henry (11), and has an overall record of 545–452–38 in 122 seasons of football. 
During the undefeated 1900 football season, the Tigers were not once scored upon, posting shutouts in every single game that they played. The College's largest margin of victory was 110–0 over Virginia Medical College in 1913; largest margin of victory over a conference foe was 70–0 over Richmond in 1901; and largest margin of defeat was 0–136 to VMI in 1920.

Football was introduced to the college by William Ford "Billy" Bull in 1892 after he matriculated as a freshman. Bull was also the captain of the squad for the team's first match up against Randolph–Macon College in 1893, a bitter rivalry known as The Game – the oldest small-school rivalry in the South – which has been contested 119 times. Bull led the Tigers to a record of one win and two losses over his three seasons as head coach, earning the College's first victory in 1894 with a 28–0 win over William & Mary.

The Tigers' first winning season came in 1896 under the tutelage George H. Denny, an alumnus of H–SC. Denny would later go on to be the president of the University of Alabama and the original namesake of Bryant–Denny Stadium. The only years that H–SC did not field a football team were in 1904 and 1943 due to a large percentage of the student body being drafted into the war.

Hampden–Sydney was an independent from 1892 through 1899. In 1900, the school joined together with William & Mary, Richmond, and Randolph–Macon to form the Eastern Division of the Intercollegiate Association until 1921. In 1946, the Tigers joined the Mason–Dixon Conference and remained a member until the conference disbanded in 1975. In 1975, H–SC joined as a charter member of the Virginia College Conference which was quickly renamed the Old Dominion Athletic Conference (ODAC) in 1976.

The College's first long-term coach was alumnus "Yank" Bernier, who coached the team from 1912 to 1916 and again from 1923 to 1938. Bernier also holds the distinction of being the first athletic director for the college.  The school saw its first real success in football when another alumnus, J. Stokeley Fulton, became the head coach in 1960, serving in that role until 1984 when he succumbed to cancer. Fulton is the longest tenured Hampden–Sydney head coach with 25 seasons and is the all-time winningest coach in school history compiling a 143–99–5 record. Fulton, inducted into the Virginia Sports Hall of Fame in 1977, lead his team to 9 conference championships, back-to-back Knute Rockne Bowls in 1971 and 1972, and was voted as the ODAC coach of the year 3 times.

The Tigers are currently coached by Marty Favret who was hired in 2000. Going into his 16th season, Favret has won 5 conference championships (2007, 2009, 2011, 2013, and 2014) and has coached the Tigers to 6 Division III playoff appearances. The success that Favret has had on the field (compiling a 111–46 record and 71% winning percentage) has resulted in Tiger home football games becoming one of the most highly attended sporting events in all of Division III athletics – in 2012 Hampden–Sydney averaged 6723 fans per game, ranking 3rd nationally.

Through the 2015 season, Hampden–Sydney has compiled an official overall record of 545 wins, 452 losses, 38 ties; won 32 conference titles; appeared in 2 bowl games; and earned its way into 7 Division III tournament appearances with the most recent being in 2014.

Seasons
|| The Game

References 

Lists of college football seasons

Hampden–Sydney Tigers football seasons